Ski jumping at the 2017 European Youth Olympic Winter Festival was held in Erzurum, Turkey at the Kiremitlik Hill Ski Jumping Facility from 13 to 17 February 2017.

Medal table

Results

Men's events

Ladies events

Mixed events

References

External links
Results Book – Ski Jumping

2017 in ski jumping
2017 European Youth Olympic Winter Festival events
2017